Kazakhstan is a multiethnic country where the indigenous ethnic group, the Kazakhs, comprise the majority of the population. As of 2021, ethnic Kazakhs are about 70% of the population and ethnic Russians in Kazakhstan are about 16%. These are the two dominant ethnic groups in the country with a wide array of other groups represented, including Ukrainians, Uzbeks, Germans, Tatars, Chechens, Ingush, Uyghurs, Koreans, and Meskhetian Turks.

History 

Kazakhstan's dominant ethnic group, the Kazakhs, traces its origin to the 15th century, when after disintegration of Golden Horde, number of Turkic and Turco-Mongol tribes united to establish the Kazakh Khanate. With a cohesive culture and a national identity, they constituted an absolute majority on the land until Russian colonization.
Russian advancement into the territory of Kazakhstan began in the late 18th century, when the Kazakhs nominally accepted Russian rule in exchange for protection against repeated attacks by the western Mongolian Kalmyks. In the 1890s, Russian peasants began to settle the fertile lands of northern Kazakhstan, causing many Kazakhs to move eastwards into Chinese territory in search of new grazing grounds.

Drastic changes during the 20th century 
A big factor that greatly shaped the ethnic composition of Kazakhstan were major famines of the 1920s and of the 1930s. According to different estimates, in the 1930s up to 40% of Kazakhs either died of starvation or fled the territory. Official government census data report the contraction of Kazakh population from 3.6 million in 1926, to 2.3 million in 1939.

By the mid 20th century, Kazakhstan was home to virtually all ethnic groups that had ever come under the Russian sphere of influence. This diverse demography stemmed from the country's central location and its historical use by Russia as a place to send colonists, dissidents, and minority groups from its other frontiers. From the 1930s until the 1950s, both Russian opposition (and Russians who were "accused" of being part of the opposition) and certain minorities (especially Volga Germans, Poles, Ukrainians, Crimean Tatars and Kalmyks) had been interned in labor camps, often merely due to their heritage or beliefs, mostly on collective orders by Joseph Stalin.  This makes Kazakhstan one of the few places on Earth where normally-disparate Germanic, Indo-Iranian, Koreans, Chechen, and Turkic groups live together in a rural setting and not as a result of modern immigration. 

After the fall of the Soviet Union, the German population of Kazakhstan (Kasachstandeutsche) proceeded to emigrate en masse during the 1990s, as Germany was willing to repatriate these so-called Spätaussiedler, and many Russians went back to Russia. Also, many of the Greek took the chance to repatriate to Greece. Some groups have fewer good options for emigration, but because of the economic situation are also leaving at rates comparable to the rest of the former East bloc.

Table of historic ethnic composition of Kazakhstan 

Table:

List

Census of 1999

Table: Ethnic composition of Kazakhstan (detailed census data)

Total Slavic/European population 27.0% in 2009 (compared with 60.3% in 1959, 57.3% in 1970, 54.5% in 1979, 49.8% in 1989 and 39.0% in 1999).

Demographic data

Vital statistics

As explained above, the Slavic groups have been declining ever since the 1960s, due to low birth rates and high death rates. Germans are characterized by very high birth rates, but it is mostly due to the high proportion of rural population and the presence of conservative religious factions like Mennonites and Evangelical Lutherans among them.

Table: Demographic characteristics of various ethnic groups of Kazakhstan

Inter-ethnic marriages

Most of the inter-ethnic marriages in Kazakhstan has been between various Slavic or Germanic groups (Russian - Ukrainian, German - Ukrainian, Russian - Polish or German - Russian). Inter-marriages between Turkic and European ethnic groups are increasing, but still quite rare.

Table: Number of individuals married outside their ethnic group

Mechanical population movement

Slavic and Germanic groups have been emigrating en masse since the 1960s, and the movement accelerated during the 1990s after the breakup of the Soviet Union. This has resulted in the reduction of the proportion of European ethnic groups in the population by more than half. More than 50% of the European Soviet ethnic groups have left Kazakhstan since 1989, and just 15% of the pre-1989 ethnic German population remains now in the country.

Most of the immigration has been directed towards Russia, but small numbers have been immigrating to Ukraine, Belarus and Armenia also. Before the German authorities stopped the repatriation of ethnic Germans and their non-German relatives, Germany was one of the most favored destination for all the ethnic groups. It is estimated that close to half of the 4.5 million Soviet Germans and their Slavic kin who now live in Germany are originally from Kazakhstan. Currently on average close to 2,000 ethnic Germans emigrate from Kazakhstan to ethnic German dominated areas in Russia such as Azovsky Nemetsky National District (Deutsche Nationalkreis Asowo) in Omsk Oblast and Nemetsky National District (Nationalkreis Halbstadt) in Altai Krai. Also, out of the 1.2 million Russian speaking Jews and Slavs who live in Israel, a significant portion is from Kazakhstan.

On the other hand, ethnic Kazakhs and Uzbeks have been immigrating in large numbers to Kazakhstan ever since the collapse of the USSR. These immigrants come not only from the southern Central Asian states such as Uzbekistan and Tajikistan, but also from the Kazakh dominated areas in Xinjiang and Mongolia. The Kazakh government is actively encouraging the settlement of these compatriots (known as Oralman) in Slavic dominated North and East Kazakhstan as well as the German dominated Karaganda Region, in order to dilute the minority populations there. There is also a low intensity immigration of ethnic Slavs from the less tolerant neighboring nations like Uzbekistan and Turkmenistan into Kazakhstan. An estimated 400,000 Uzbeks have migrated to Kazakhstan in recent years.

Table: Data on immigration in Kazakhstan

Religion
According to the 2009 Census data, almost all the Central Asian Turkics are Muslims and Slavs are Orthodox (although more than 1% of Russians are Muslim), while Koreans are mixed between various different faiths including Christianity, Buddhism, Atheism, and Islam :

See also
 Demographics of Kazakhstan
 Assembly of People of Kazakhstan
 Russians in Kazakhstan
 Ukrainians in Kazakhstan
 Germans in Kazakhstan
 Poles in Kazakhstan
 Greeks in Kazakhstan
 Koreans in Kazakhstan
 Uyghurs in Kazakhstan
 Chinese in Kazakhstan
 Turks in Kazakhstan
 Kurds in Kazakhstan
 Armenians in Kazakhstan
 Azerbaijanis in Kazakhstan
 Tatars of Kazakhstan
 Bulgarians in Kazakhstan
 Romanians in Kazakhstan

References

Demographics of Kazakhstan